Lobaria anomala, commonly known as the netted specklebelly, is a species of foliose lichen in the family Peltigeraceae. It is found in coastal western North America, where it grows on trees in humid environments.

Taxonomy

The lichen was first formally described as a new species in 1987 by Irwin M. Brodo and Teuvo Ahti as a species of Pseudocyphellaria. It had previously been mentioned in various scientific papers, but never validly published. For example, George Knox Merrill had proposed the name Sticta limbata var. anomala in a 1909 exsiccata series, but without properly describing it: he published a description in English, but the requirement at the time was for this description to be in Latin. Adolf Hugo Magnusson published the species (as Pseudocyphellaria anomala) in 1940, but invalidly. The type specimen was collected in 1908 from King County, Washington by amateur botanist Albert Scott Foster.

In 2013, Bibiana Moncada and Robert Lücking proposed the new genus Anomalobaria to contain the species Anomalobaria anthraspis, and the type species, Anomalobaria anomala. This was based on molecular phylogenetic analysis that suggested that these species formed a distinct clade in a sampling of species formerly placed in Pseudocyphellaria. The main diagnostic difference between Lobaria and Anomalobaria was the presence of pseudocyphellae on the lobe undersides of the latter genus. Later molecular work, however, did not support the recognition of Anomalobaria as distinct from Lobaria, and the former name was synonymized with the latter.

In 2014, Toby Spribille and Bruce McCune formally transferred the taxon to genus Lobaria. The vernacular name of the lichen is the netted specklebelly, which refers to the net-like ridges on the upper thallus as well as the pale specks of pseudocyphellae on the undersurface.

Description

The thallus of Lobaria anomala is medium to dark brown and features ridges and depressions that are punctuated by white or grey soredia, and sometimes rounded to irregular soralia between the ridges. Apothecia are rare in this species. It contains stictic acid and triterpenes as lichen products. The expected results for standard chemical spot tests are: medulla PD+ (orange), K+ (yellow), KC−, and C−.

Habitat and distribution

Lobaria anomala occurs in western North America, along the Pacific coast of the United States and Canada. It grows on both deciduous and coniferous trees on humid locales, particularly in the Interior Cedar Hemlock zone and in low-elevation coastal forests. Its range extends north from Alaska, through British Columbia, south to California.

Species interactions

Lichenicolous (lichen-dwelling) fungi that have been recorded growing on Lobaria anomala include Plectocarpon lichenum, and a Dactylospora not identified to species.

References

Peltigerales
Lichen species
Lichens described in 1987
Lichens of Subarctic America
Lichens of Western Canada
Lichens of the Northwestern United States
Lichens of the Southwestern United States
Taxa named by Irwin Brodo
Taxa named by Teuvo Ahti